Buila Katiavala (born 13 May 1976 in Kananga, Lulua District, Democratic Republic of the Congo) is an Angola-Congolese basketball player with Clube Desportivo da Huíla in Angola. He competed with the Angola national basketball team at the 2000 Summer Olympics.

References

External links
 

1976 births
Living people
People from Kananga
Democratic Republic of the Congo men's basketball players
Angolan men's basketball players
Olympic basketball players of Angola
Basketball players at the 2000 Summer Olympics
Centers (basketball)
C.D. Primeiro de Agosto men's basketball players
21st-century Democratic Republic of the Congo people